The 1974–75 Duke Blue Devils men's basketball team represented Duke University in the 1974–75 NCAA Division I men's basketball season. The head coach was Bill Foster and the team finished the season with an overall record of 13–13 and did not qualify for the NCAA tournament.

Roster

Schedule

References 

Duke Blue Devils men's basketball seasons
Duke
Duke Blue
Duke Blue